Rohit Jivanlal Parikh (born November 20, 1936) is an Indian-American mathematician, logician, and philosopher who has worked in many areas in traditional logic, including recursion theory and proof theory. He is a Distinguished Professor at Brooklyn College at the City University of New York (CUNY).

Research
Parikh worked on topics like vagueness, ultrafinitism, belief revision, logic of knowledge, game theory and social software (social procedure). This last area seeks to combine techniques from logic, computer science (especially logic of programs) and game theory to understand the structure of social algorithms.

Personal life and politics
Rohit Parikh was married from 1968 to 1994 to Carol Parikh (née Geris), who is best known for her stories and biography of Oscar Zariski, The Unreal Life of Oscar Zariski. 

Parikh is a nontheist opposing abortions. To fight abortions he joined the Atheist and Agnostic Pro-Life League.

In 2018, a Facebook post by Parikh, called for deportation of all illegal immigrants, writing, "I do believe that everyone who is illegally here should be deported but that the US should support them in their home country." Parikh further claims in the Facebook post that Hispanic immigrants are insufficiently educated compared to Indian immigrants like him, leading Brooklyn College students to public protests and calls for the university to discipline him. The president of Brooklyn College Michelle Anderson called his remarks "antithetical to the fundamental values of Brooklyn College." Defending his position in an interview to a CW-affiliate WPIX, Parikh claimed he had not meant that Hispanics in general were dumber than Indians in general, but rather that his comparison of intellectual abilities of Hispanics and Indians had applied only to those who had immigrated to the United States. "There are a lot of stupid people in India but they don't come here," he explained.

Posts 
 Editor, International Journal of the Foundations of Computer Science, 1990–1995
 Editor, Journal of Philosophical Logic, 2000–2003

Awards and recognition 
 William Lowell Putnam Mathematical Competition Prize Winner, 1955, 1956, 1957
 Gibbs Prize, Bombay University, 1954

Notable students 
Parikh's doctoral students include Alessandra Carbone and David Ellerman.

Academic and research appointments 
 Distinguished Professor, City University of New York, (Brooklyn College and CUNY Graduate Center), 1982–present
 Professor, Mathematics, Boston University, 1972–1982
 Visiting Professor, Mathematics, Courant Institute, 1981
 Associate Professor, Mathematics, Boston University, 1967–1972
 Visiting Associate Professor, Mathematics, SUNY at Buffalo, 1971–1972
 Lecturer, Bristol University, 1965–1967
 Reader, Panjab University, 1964–1965
 Instructor, Stanford University 1961–1963
 Visiting Appointments at Caltech, ETH Zurich, MIT, Stanford, and TIFR Bombay

Main publications 

 Existence and Feasibility in Arithmetic, Jour. Symbolic Logic 36 (1971) 494–508.
 On the Length of Proofs, Transactions of the Amer. Math. Soc. 177 (1973) 29–36.
 (With M. Parnes) Conditional Probability can be Defined for Arbitrary Pairs of Sets of Reals, Adv. Math. 9 (1972) 520–522.
 (With D.H.J. de Jongh) Well Partial Orderings and Hierarchies, Proc. Kon. Ned. Akad. Sci Series A 80 (1977) 195–207.
 (With D. Kozen) An Elementary Completeness Proof for PDL Theoretical Computer Science 14 (1981) 113–118.
 The Problem of Vague Predicates, in Logic, Language and Method Ed. Cohen and Wartofsky, Reidel (1982) 241–261.
 The Logic of Games and its Applications, Annals of Discrete Math., 24 (1985) 111–140.
 (With R. Ramanujam) Distributed Processing and the Logic of Knowledge, in Logics of Programs, Springer Lecture Notes in Computer Science, 193 pp. 256–268.
 Communication, Consensus and Knowledge, (with P. Krasucki), Jour. Economic Theory 52 (1990) pp. 178–189.
 Knowledge and the Problem of Logical Omniscience ISMIS- 87 (International Symp. on Methodology for Intelligent Systems), North Holland (1987) pp. 432–439.
 Finite and Infinite Dialogues, in the Proceedings of a Workshop on Logic from Computer Science, Ed. Moschovakis, MSRI publications, Springer 1991 pp. 481–498.
 Vagueness and Utility: the Semantics of Common Nouns in Linguistics and Philosophy 17 1994, 521–35.
 Topological Reasoning and The Logic of Knowledge (with Dabrowski and Moss) Annals of Pure and Applied Logic 78 (1996) 73–110.
 Belief revision and language splitting, in Proc. Logic, Language and Computation, Ed. Moss, Ginzburg and de Rijke, CSLI 1999, pp. 266–278 (earlier version appeared in 1996 in the preliminary proceedings).
 (with Samir Chopra), Relevance Sensitive Belief Structures, Annals of Mathematics and Artificial Intelligence, 28(1–4): 259–285 (2000).
 Social Software, Synthese, 132, Sep 2002, 187–211.
 (with Jouko Vaananen), Finite information logic, Annals of Pure and Applied Logic, 134 (2005) 83–93.
 (With R. Ramanujam), A Knowledge based Semantics of Messages, Jour. Logic, Language and Information, 12 2003, 453–467.
 Levels of Knowledge, Games, and Group Action, Research in Economics, 57 2003, 267–281.

 Costa, Horacio Arlo, and Rohit Parikh. "Conditional probability and defeasible inference." Journal of Philosophical Logic 34.1 (2005): 97–119.

 Arlo-Costa, Horacio, and Rohit Parikh. "Two place probabilities, beliefs and belief revision: on the foundations of iterative belief kinematics." Proceedings of The Twelfth Amsterdam Colloquium. 1999.

 Weiss, M. Angela, and Rohit Parikh. "Completeness of certain bimodal logics for subset spaces." Studia Logica (2002): 1–30.

 Parikh, Rohit, and Adriana Renero. "Justified True Belief: Plato, Gettier, and Turing." Philosophical explorations of the legacy of Alan Turing. Springer, Cham, 2017. 93–102.

References

External links 
 Parikh's archive on the CUNY Philosophy Commons
 Rohit Parikh's Curriculum Vitae
 Brooklyn College home page
 An Interview with Rohit Parikh 

1936 births
Putnam Fellows
American logicians
Belief revision
Harvard University alumni
Game theorists
Brooklyn College faculty
City University of New York faculty
Graduate Center, CUNY faculty
Living people
People from Banaskantha district